The Complex is a 5,350 seat, multi-purpose arena in Valdosta, Georgia, USA.  Construction began in 1979 and was completed in 1982.  It is the home of the Valdosta State University Blazers basketball and volleyball teams.  The Complex also contains a four lane jogging track and offices for the athletic department, kinesiology, and physical education departments.

References
 2007-08 Valdosta State Student Athlete Handbook
 Valdosta State Basketball

Indoor arenas in Georgia (U.S. state)
College basketball venues in the United States
Sports venues in Georgia (U.S. state)
Valdosta State University campus
Sports venues completed in 1983
College volleyball venues in the United States
Valdosta State Blazers men's basketball
Indoor track and field venues in the United States
College track and field venues in the United States
1983 establishments in Georgia (U.S. state)